Nizamüddin Ahmed Pasha was an Ottoman statesman. He was second Grand Vizier of the Ottoman Empire from 1331 to 1348.

See also 
 List of Ottoman Grand Viziers

References 

14th-century Grand Viziers of the Ottoman Empire
Turks from the Ottoman Empire
1281 births
1380 deaths